Colosyta is a genus of moths belonging to the family Tortricidae.

Species
Colosyta ocystolus (Meyrick, 1932)

See also
List of Tortricidae genera

References

 , 1997, Misc. Zool. 20: 135.
 , 2005, World Catalogue of Insects 5

External links
tortricidae.com

Euliini
Tortricidae genera